Max Felchlin AG is a producer of chocolate and of baking and confectionery ingredients, headquartered in Schwyz, Switzerland.

History
Businessman Max Josef Felchlin opened a honey shop in Schwyz in 1908, and expanded to chocolate by the 1920s. In 1928, Felchlin relocated the business to a rural estate in Seewen-Schwyz, called Liebwylen, and continued to expand the product line to other confections and ingredients. 

In 1937, Felchlin developed a new type of praline and nougat mixture, the ‘Pralinosa’, which is still being sold today. During World War II, Felchlin produced Sowiso, a milk powder.

Felchlin transferred control of the company to his son, Max Felchlin Jr., in 1962, and died in 1970, at the age of 87. In 1974, the company became a public limited corporation, the Max Felchlin AG, and established a new factory in Ibach-Schwyz. In 1980, the company exported their products to Japan and the USA for the first time. 

In 1991, Felchlin, Jr. arranged for an association of local Schwyz residents to take majority ownership of the company after his death. The association named Christian Aschwanden as CEO, subsequent to the death of Felchlin in 1992. The company moved to a new factory in Ibach in 2000. By 2006, Felchlin produced 2,500 tons per year. In 2016, Jamie Oliver visited the Felchlin chocolate manufacture in Schwyz for series Jamie's Super Food on Channel 4.

In 2012, the company started construction for a new cacao roasting plant, which was finished in 2014. In the same year Felchlin acquired a new property next to their current facilities in Ibach and started planning and construction of new and centralised headquarters. In 2018, the entire company moved into the new building complex.

Products and services
Max Felchlin primarily sells wholesale to other confectioners, such as Sprüngli. The most prominent retail product is the Grand Cru line, introduced in 1999, which includes the Maracaibo Clasificado 65%. Felchlin proposes milk and white chocolates made exclusively with milk from the Entlebuch Biosphere, named "Grand Cru Opus Lait de Terroir".

Since 1988, the company has also offered on-site training for pastry chefs and other customers at its Condirama building in Schwyz.

Awards and recognitions 
A chocolate from the company's Grand Cru line, the Maracaibo Clasificado (65%), is named as the "World's Best Chocolate" by the Accademia Maestri Pasticceri Italiani in 2004.

See also
Swiss chocolate
List of bean-to-bar chocolate manufacturers

References

External links

Brand name chocolate
Food and drink companies of Switzerland
Swiss chocolate companies
Food and drink companies established in 1908
Swiss brands
Swiss companies established in 1908